The Scandinavian Journal of Educational Research is a peer-reviewed academic journal covering research in education, published by Routledge. It is abstracted and indexed in the Social Sciences Citation Index.

External links 
 

Education journals
English-language journals
Biannual journals
Taylor & Francis academic journals
Publications established in 1971